Cornell Warner (born August 12, 1948) is an American former professional basketball player.

A 6'9" forward/center from Jackson State University, Warner played seven seasons (1970–1977) in the National Basketball Association as a member of the Buffalo Braves, Cleveland Cavaliers, Milwaukee Bucks, and Los Angeles Lakers. He averaged 6.4 points per game and 7.5 rebounds per game in his NBA career. Warner's statistically strongest season was 1974–75, during which he averaged 7.6 points and 10.3 rebounds for the Bucks.

In October 1977, he signed with Fribourg Olympic Basket of Switzerland. Warner played until 1979 for the club, winning the Swiss national championship in 1978 and 1979.

NBA career statistics

Regular season

|-
| align="left" | 1970–71
| align="left" | Buffalo
| 65 || - || 19.9 || .415 || - || .552 || 7.0 || 0.8 || - || - || 6.0
|-
| align="left" | 1971–72
| align="left" | Buffalo
| 62 || - || 20.0 || .443 || - || .744 || 6.1 || 0.9 || - || - || 6.2
|-
| align="left" | 1972–73
| align="left" | Buffalo
| 4 || - || 11.8 || .471 || - || .500 || 3.8 || 1.5 || - || - || 4.3
|-
| align="left" | 1972–73
| align="left" | Cleveland
| 68 || - || 19.5 || .411 || - || .659 || 7.5 || 1.0 || - || - || 5.7
|-
| align="left" | 1973–74
| align="left" | Cleveland
| 5 || - || 9.8 || .154 || - || 1.000 || 3.4 || 0.8 || 0.0 || 0.4 || 1.6
|-
| align="left" | 1973–74
| align="left" | Milwaukee
| 67 || - || 20.2 || .512 || - || .736 || 5.7 || 1.0 || 0.4 || 0.6 || 6.3
|-
| align="left" | 1974-75
| align="left" | Milwaukee
| 79 || - || 31.9 || .458 || - || .684 || 10.3 || 1.6 || 0.6 || 0.7 || 7.6
|-
| align="left" | 1975–76
| align="left" | Los Angeles
| 81 || - || 31.0 || .479 || - || .695 || 8.9 || 1.3 || 0.7 || 0.6 || 7.3
|-
| align="left" | 1976–77
| align="left" | Los Angeles
| 14 || - || 12.1 || .472 || - || .667 || 4.9 || 0.8 || 0.1 || 0.1 || 3.9
|- class="sortbottom"
| style="text-align:center;" colspan="2"| Career
| 445 || - || 23.6 || .452 || - || .672 || 7.5 || 1.1 || 0.5 || 0.6 || 6.4
|}

Playoffs

|-
| align="left" | 1973–74
| align="left" | Milwaukee
| 16 || - || 31.6 || .423 || - || .684 || 10.2 || 1.3 || 0.4 || 0.9 || 6.7
|-
| align="left" | 1976–77
| align="left" | Los Angeles
| 5 || - || 11.2 || .583 || - || .000 || 1.8 || 1.2 || 0.2 || 0.0 || 2.8
|- class="sortbottom"
| style="text-align:center;" colspan="2"| Career
| 21 || - || 26.7 || .439 || - || .684 || 8.2 || 1.2 || 0.4 || 0.7 || 5.8
|}

References

1948 births
Living people
African-American basketball players
American expatriate basketball people in the Philippines
Basketball players from Jackson, Mississippi
Buffalo Braves draft picks
Buffalo Braves players
Centers (basketball)
Cleveland Cavaliers players
Crispa Redmanizers players
Fribourg Olympic players
Jackson State Tigers basketball players
Los Angeles Lakers players
Milwaukee Bucks players
Philippine Basketball Association imports
Power forwards (basketball)
American men's basketball players
21st-century African-American people
20th-century African-American sportspeople